Augustino Manyanda Masele (born 15 June 1966) is a Tanzanian CCM politician and Member of Parliament for the Mbogwe constituency since 2010.

References

1966 births
Living people
Chama Cha Mapinduzi MPs
Tanzanian MPs 2010–2015
Shinga Secondary School alumni
Minaki Secondary School alumni
Osmania University alumni
Open University of Tanzania alumni